Cobham Bridge is a  long girder bridge in Hamilton, New Zealand, on Cobham Drive, which is part of SH1.

It spans the Waikato River. The Ministry of Works plaque at the southern end of the bridge says they designed it and it was opened on 29 June 1963.

Like the 1962 Cobham Bridge over the Whanganui River, it was opened when Lord Cobham was Governor General, though not opened by him. Mrs Adams-Schneider, Mayor Denis Rogers and Minister of Works, Stan Goosman, were at the opening.

References

External links 
 Google Street Scene from the bridge
 Hamilton City Libraries 1960s construction photos
Aerial views –
 April 1963 view of construction
 1969 view showing also Victoria and Claudelands Bridges

Bridges over the Waikato River
Buildings and structures in Hamilton, New Zealand
Bridges in Waikato